Vitellozzo Vitelli (1531 – 19 November 1568) was an Italian cardinal of the Roman Catholic Church.

Life

Vitelli was born in 1531 in Città di Castello of Captain Alessandro Vitellozzi, signore of Amatrice, and Angela di Troilo Rossi, and educated at the University of Padua.

He was ordained a cleric of Città di Castello and appointed bishop there on 20 March 1554, an office he would resign in 1560.

He went to Rome in February 1556 and was created cardinal deacon 15 March 1557, receiving the deaconry of Ss. Sergio e Bacco on 24 March. He opted for the deaconry of S. Maria in Portico Octaviae in March 1559 and that of Santa Maria in Via Lata in November 1564.

He held numerous administrative posts and participated in the conclaves of 1559, which elected Pope Pius IV, and of 1565–1566, which elected Pope Pius V.

He died on 19 November 1568 in Rome and was buried in his titular church of Santa Maria in Via Lata.

Notes and references

Sources

  

1531 births
1538 deaths
16th-century Italian cardinals
People from Città di Castello
Vitellozzo
Counts of Montone
16th-century Italian Roman Catholic bishops